Nanobba Kalla is a 1979 Indian Kannada-language film directed by Dorai–Bhagavan, and produced by actor Shivaram along with his brother S. Ramanathan (Rashi Brothers). The film stars Rajkumar and Lakshmi. Rajkumar played a dual role of father and son and also makes a guest appearance as matinee idol Dr.Rajkumar in one scene. It is based on the story written by Chi. Udayashankar and M. D. Sundar.

The film was received positively upon release. Music for the film was composed by the duo Rajan–Nagendra.

Cast
 Rajkumar as Gopi/DCP Chandrashekhar/Dr. Rajkumar (cameo)
 Lakshmi as Rukmini
 Kanchana as Savitri
 Thoogudeepa Srinivas
 Tiger Prabhakar
 Shivaram
 Dheerendra Gopal
 Vajramuni
 Rajanand
 Shakti Prasad

Soundtrack

The duo of Rajan–Nagendra composed the background score and soundtrack of the film, with lyrics for the latter written by Chi. Udayashankar. The soundtrack album consists of four tracks.

References

External links
 
 Nanobba Kalla stills
 Nanobba Kalla Soundtrack

1979 films
1970s Kannada-language films
Indian action films
Films scored by Rajan–Nagendra
Films with screenplays by Chi. Udayashankar
1979 action films
Films directed by Dorai–Bhagavan